Louis Jacobus van Zyl (born 20 July 1985), better known as L. J. van Zyl, is a South African athlete competing in the 400 metre hurdles. He is the South African record holder in the event with a personal best of 47.66 seconds, which he achieved twice, three months apart. His time ranks him in the all-time top 25.  He is a three-time African Champion in the event and competed for his country at the 2008, 2012 and 2016 Summer Olympics.

He was the 2002 World Junior Champion over 400 m hurdles and reached the World Championships final at the age of twenty in 2005. His breakthrough into the senior ranks came in 2006 when he won gold medals at the Commonwealth Games and African Championships, as well as silver medals at the IAAF World Cup and IAAF World Athletics Final. He became the All-Africa Games champion in 2007. He came fifth in the 2008 Olympic final.

He married South African long-distance runner Irvette van Blerk in 2012.

Career
Born in Bloemfontein, his first international medal came at the 2001 World Youth Championships in Athletics, where he took the bronze with South Africa in the Swedish medley relay. He won the gold medal in his speciality at the 2002 World Junior Championships in Athletics, but did not medal in his attempt to defend the title at the 2004 competition. His international breakthrough came at the World Athletics Final in 2005, when he finished third.

The next year he won a gold medal at the Commonwealth Games with a new personal best time of 48.05 seconds, which was a new Games record. He also won a silver medal in 4×400 m relay with the South African team. Later that year he claimed his first continental title with a win at the 2006 African Championships in Athletics. He came near his best with a run of 48.08 seconds at the 2006 IAAF World Athletics Final, finishing as runner-up, and secured another silver medal at the 2006 IAAF World Cup.

He was off colour in 2007, being eliminated in the heats at the 2007 World Championships in Athletics and finishing eighth at the 2007 IAAF World Athletics Final. However, he did manage to win the hurdles title at the 2007 All-Africa Games in Algiers that July. He rebounded the following year and retained his title at the 2008 African Championships and earned a place on the South African Olympic team. Van Zyl came fifth in the 400 m hurdles final at the 2008 Beijing Olympics, and also ran as part of the national relay team. His clocking of 48.22 seconds at the Athens Grand Prix Tsiklitiria made him the fourth fastest in the event that year.

He was eliminated in the semi-finals at the 2009 World Championships in Athletics, despite entering the competition with the fastest time of the year. He ended the year on a positive note with a silver medal behind Kerron Clement (the new world champion) at the 2009 IAAF World Athletics Final.

Van Zyl set the South African record of 47.66 seconds at an athletics meeting in Pretoria on 25 February 2011, improving upon Llewellyn Herbert's former mark. He made a large improvement upon his 400 m sprint best a month later, taking almost a second off his former best with a run of 44.86 sec at a Yellow Pages Series meeting.

Van Zyl won a bronze medal in the 400m hurdles at the 2011 World Championships in Athletics but again he entered the competition with not only the fastest but the 4 fastest times of the year so perhaps a disappointing result. He later won a silver with the South African team in the 4x400m relay.

Affiliations
TuksSport – University of Pretoria, South Africa

Achievements

Personal bests
400 metres – 44.86 s (2011)
400 metres hurdles – 47.66 s (2011)
200 metres hurdles-22.10(1.8 m/s)WR

References

External links

Focus on Athletes article from IAAF

1985 births
Living people
Sportspeople from Bloemfontein
University of Pretoria alumni
South African male hurdlers
Olympic athletes of South Africa
Athletes (track and field) at the 2008 Summer Olympics
Athletes (track and field) at the 2012 Summer Olympics
Athletes (track and field) at the 2016 Summer Olympics
Commonwealth Games gold medallists for South Africa
Commonwealth Games silver medallists for South Africa
Commonwealth Games medallists in athletics
Athletes (track and field) at the 2006 Commonwealth Games
Athletes (track and field) at the 2010 Commonwealth Games
Athletes (track and field) at the 2014 Commonwealth Games
Athletes (track and field) at the 2018 Commonwealth Games
World Athletics Championships medalists
World Athletics Championships athletes for South Africa
African Games gold medalists for South Africa
African Games medalists in athletics (track and field)
Athletes (track and field) at the 2007 All-Africa Games
Afrikaner people
South African people of Dutch descent
South African Athletics Championships winners
Medallists at the 2006 Commonwealth Games
Medallists at the 2010 Commonwealth Games